Divorce and the Daughter is a 1916 American silent drama film directed by Frederic Richard Sullivan. The film stars Florence La Badie, Edwin Stanley, Ethelmary Oakland and Kathryn Adams.

Plot
Alicia is a poor girl living in the city with her family. When her father receives an inheritance, he is able to follow his dream of becoming an artist and moves his family near an artist's colony in the country. There he falls prey to a scheming widow, and he and his wife separate. Alicia, meanwhile, has become involved with a young man who is the widow's accomplice, and she throws over her former suitor, Dr. John Osborne. The young man is a proponent of free love, but he gets a little too free with Alicia and she beans him with a small statuette. She goes running back to her doctor sweetheart, and her parents decide to reconcile, since their separation obviously isn't doing their children any good.

Cast
Florence La Badie - Alicia
Edwin Stanley - Dr. John Osborne
Kathryn Adams - Mrs. Cameron
Sam Niblack - Herbert Rawlins 
J. H. Gilmour - The father 
Zenaide Williams - The mother
Ethelmary Oakland - The children 
Arthur Le Vien - The children

Preservation status
A print is preserved in the BFI National Film and Television Archive, London.

References

External links

1916 films
American silent feature films
American black-and-white films
1916 drama films
Silent American drama films
Pathé Exchange films
1910s American films